Leucanopsis bactris is a moth of the family Erebidae. It was described by Sepp in 1852. It is found in Suriname, Ecuador, Peru and Bolivia.

The larvae have been recorded feeding on Bactris acanthocarpa.

References

bactris
Moths described in 1852